Raffaele Vallone (17 February 1916 – 31 October 2002) was an Italian actor and footballer. One of the top male Italian stars of the 1950s and '60s, he first became known for his association with the neorealist movement, and found success in several international productions. On stage, he was closely associated with the works of Arthur Miller. He played the role of Eddie Carbone in A View from the Bridge several times, notably in Sidney Lumet's 1962 film adaptation, for which he won the David di Donatello for Best Actor.

Early life
Vallone was born in Tropea, Calabria, the son of a lawyer, and moved to Turin at an early age. He attended Liceo classico Cavour and studied law and philosophy at the University of Turin, where his professors included Leone Ginzburg and future President Luigi Einaudi. After graduation, he was employed at his father's law firm.

In 1941, Vallone became the culture editor for the culture section of L'Unità, then the official newspaper of the Italian Communist Party, and also a film and drama critic for the Turin newspaper La Stampa. An anti-fascist, he joined the Italian resistance organization Giustizia e Libertà in 1943, after the Badoglio Proclamation. He was arrested and incarcerated in Como, but escaped during a prisoner transfer, swimming across Lake Como in the process.

Football 
Vallone played association football from a young age, as a member of the Unione Libera Italiana del Calcio (ULIC) youth club for Turin, winning the championship for the 1930–31 season. He began playing professionally in 1934 while still a law student, entering Serie A for Torino F.C. as a midfielder. He won the Coppa Italia with his team in the 1935–36 season. He played for Novara in the 1939–40 season, and retired after 1941.

Acting career 
Vallone made his film debut in 1942 as an extra in We the Living, but he was not initially interested in an acting career. Nevertheless, he was cast as a soldier competing with Vittorio Gassman for the love of Silvana Mangano in Riso amaro (Bitter Rice) (1949). The film became a neorealist classic and Vallone was launched on an international career. 

He played rugged, romantic leading man in the 1950s, including in Anna (1951) and The Beach (1954), both directed by Alberto Lattuada; Pietro Germi's The Crossroads (1951), and Giuseppe De Santis' Rome 11:00 (1952). He played Giuseppe Garibaldi, opposite Anna Magnani as Anita Garibaldi, in Francesco Rosi's directorial debut Red Shirts (1952). He was the male lead in Vittorio De Sica's Two Women, which earned its star Sophia Loren the Academy Award for Best Actress. His screen persona and acting style were often likened to those of Burt Lancaster. Curzio Malaparte, who directed him in The Forbidden Christ (1951), called Vallone "the only Marxist face in Italian cinema."

Vallone's work extended to other parts of Europe. He played opposite Maria Schell in two West German films, Love (1956) and Rose Bernd (1957), and was cast by French director Marcel Carné in Thérèse Raquin (1953). In 1956, Luis César Amadori cast him as the star of The Violet Seller, a landmark Spanish musical that was the most internationally successful Spanish-language film released up to that point.

He made his American film debut opposite Charlton Heston in the 1961 historical epic El Cid, as Count Ordóñez. He subsequently starred in Jules Dassin's Phaedra (1962), Otto Preminger's The Cardinal (1963) and Rosebud (1975), Gordon Douglas' Harlow (1965), Henry Hathaway's Nevada Smith (1966), Peter Collinson's The Italian Job (1969), John Huston's The Kremlin Letter (1970), Lamont Johnson's A Gunfight (1971), Charles Jarrott's The Other Side of Midnight (1977), J. Lee Thompson's The Greek Tycoon (1978), Michael Ritchie's An Almost Perfect Affair (1979) and Moustapha Akkad's Lion of the Desert (1980). He had a late career boost when Francis Ford Coppola cast him as Cardinal Lamberto, the future Pope John Paul I, in The Godfather Part III (1990).

On stage, Vallone was known for his association with playwright Arthur Miller, notably as Eddie Carbone in A View from the Bridge. He first played the role in Peter Brook's acclaimed 1958 staging in Paris at the Théâtre Antoine-Simone Berriau. He reprised it for Sidney Lumet's 1962 film adaptation, which earned him the David di Donatello for Best Actor; a 1966 ITV Play of the Week, a 1967 Italian staging that he also directed, and a 1973 version for Italian television. In 1980, he directed a production for the Théâtre de Paris.

In 1994, he was made a Knight's Grand Cross of the Order of Merit of the Italian Republic for his contributions to the arts.

Personal life 
Vallone was married to actress Elena Varzi from 1952 until his death. They had three children, two of whom are actors, Eleonora Vallone (born 1955) and Saverio Vallone (born 1958). The family lived for many years at a villa constructed near Sperlonga. During the late '50s, Vallone was romantically entangled with Brigitte Bardot.

Though an avowed communist for much of his life, Vallone was never an enrolled member of the Italian Communist Party, due to his opposition to Stalinism.

In 2001, he published his autobiography, L'alfabeto della memoria, with Gremese (Rome).

Death 
Vallone died from a heart attack in Rome on 31 October 2002. His body was buried at his  family chapel in the municipal cemetery of Tropea, his birth place.

Filmography

We the Living (1942) as A sailor
Bitter Rice (1949) as Marco
No Peace Under the Olive Tree (1950) as Francesco Dominici
The White Line (1950) as Domenico
Path of Hope (1950) as Saro Cammarata
The Crossroads (1951) as Aldo Marchi
The Forbidden Christ (1951) as Bruno Baldi
Anna (1951) as Andrea
Rome 11:00 (1952) as Carlo
 The Adventures of Mandrin (1952) as Mandrin
Red Shirts (1952) as Giuseppe Garibaldi
The Eyes Leave a Trace (1952) as Martín Jordán
 Sunday Heroes (1952) as Gino Bardi
Carne inquieta (1952) as Peppe Lamia
Perdonami! (1953) as Marco Gerace
Thérèse Raquin (1953) as Laurent
Destini di donne (Destinées) (1954) as Callias (segment "Lysistrata")
 The Beach (1954) as Silvio, the Pontorno's Mayor
 (1954) as Andrea
Obsession (1954) as Aldo Giovanni
Human Torpedoes (1954) as Commandant Carlo Ferri
The Sign of Venus (1955) as Ignazio Bolognini
Andrea Chénier (1955) as Gérard
Il segreto di Suor Angela (Le Secret de soeur Angèle) (1956) as Marcello Maglione
L'isola delle capre (Les Possédées) (1955) as Angelo
 Love (1956) as Andrea Ambaros
Rose Bernd (1957) as Arthur Streckmann
Guendalina (1957) as Guido Redaelli, padre di Guendalina
The Violet Seller (1958) as Fernando
La venganza (1958) as Luis 'El Torcido'
La trappola si chiude (Le Piège) (1958) as Gino Carsone
Recours en grâce (1960) as Mario Di Donati
Two Women (1960) as Giovanni
La Garçonnière (1960) as Alberto Fiorini
El Cid (1961) as Count Ordóñez
A View From the Bridge (1962) as Eddie Carbone
Phaedra (1962) as Thanos
The Cardinal (1963) as Cardinal Quarenghi
The Secret Invasion (1964) as Roberto Rocca - Organizer
La scoperta dell'America (1964)
Una voglia da morire (1965) as Suo Marito
Harlow (1965) as Marino Bello
Nevada Smith (1966) as Father Zaccardi
Se tutte le donne del mondo (1966) as Mr. Ardonian
The Desperate Ones (1967) as Victor
Volver a vivir (1967) as Luis Rubio
1001 Nights (1968)
La Esclava del paraíso (1968) as Hixxum
The Italian Job (1969) as Altabani
The Kremlin Letter (1970) as Puppet Maker
La morte risale a ieri sera (1970) as Amanzio Berzaghi
Cannon for Cordoba (1970) as Cordoba
A Gunfight (1971) as Francisco Álvarez
Perché non ci lasciate in pace? (1971)
The Summertime Killer (1972) as Lazzaro Alfredi
Un tipo con una faccia strana ti cerca per ucciderti (1973)
Honor Thy Father (1973) (TV) as Joseph Bonanno
Catholics (1973) as Father General
Simona (1974) as L'oncle de Marcelle
Small Miracle (1974) (TV) as Father Superior
La Casa della paura (1974) as Mr. Dreese
Rosebud (1975) as George Nikolaos
That Lucky Touch (1975) as Gen. Peruzzi
The Human Factor (1975) as Dr. Lupo
Decadenza (1975)
 Marco Visconti (1975, TV series) as Marco Visconti
The Other Side of Midnight (1977) as Constantin Demeris
The Devil's Advocate (1978) as Bishop Aurelio
The Greek Tycoon (1978) as Spyros Tomasis
An Almost Perfect Affair (1979) as Federico 'Freddie' Barone
Retour à Marseille (1980) as Michel - un émigré de retour à Marseille
Lion of the Desert (1980) as Colonel Diodiece
Sezona mira u Parizu (1981)
 I Remember Nelson (1982, TV series) - Caracciolo
A Time to Die (1982) as Genco Bari
The Scarlet and the Black (1983, TV Movie) as Father Vittorio
Christopher Columbus (1985, TV Mini-Series) as José Vizinho
Power of Evil (1985) as Laboratory director
Der Bierkönig (1990, TV Movie) as Der Baron
The Godfather Part III (1990) as Cardinal Lamberto
A Season of Giants (1990, TV Movie) as Spanish Ambassador
Julianus barát I (1991) as Archbishop Ugrin
Julianus barát II (1991) as Archbishop Ugrin
Julianus barát III (1991) as Archbishop Ugrin
The First Circle (1991, TV Movie) as Pyotr Makaraguine
Mit dem Herzen einer Mutter (1992, TV Movie) as Federico De' Conti
Toni (1999) as Le vieux / The Old Man
Vino santo (2000, TV Movie) as Nonno (final film role)

References

External links
 

1916 births
2002 deaths
Footballers from Calabria
Italian communists
Italian male film actors
Sportspeople from the Province of Vibo Valentia
Italian footballers
Serie A players
Torino F.C. players
University of Turin alumni
David di Donatello winners
Novara F.C. players
Association football midfielders
Italian resistance movement members
Italian male stage actors
Italian male television actors
Italian theatre directors
Footballers from Turin
Actors from Turin